Lachnaia hirta is a species of leaf beetles from the subfamily Cryptocephalinae. It is found in northwest Africa, on the Iberian Peninsula and in southern France, southern Italy and on Sicily.

References

Clytrini
Beetles described in 1801
Taxa named by Johan Christian Fabricius